Bidar is described as City of Whispering Monuments. The mountaintop town that served as the capital of medieval Deccan, has 98 monuments of which four national monuments are protected by the Archaeological Survey of India and 14 by the State Archaeology Department, Karnataka.

Bidar earned a place on the World Monument Watch list 2014.

List of monuments in Bidar 

|}

See also 
 List of Monuments of National Importance in Bangalore circle
 List of Monuments of National Importance in Belgaum district
 List of Monuments of National Importance in Bijapur district
 List of Monuments of National Importance in Dharwad district
 List of Monuments of National Importance in Gulbarga district
 List of Monuments of National Importance in North Kanara district
 List of Monuments of National Importance in Raichur district
 List of Monuments of National Importance in India for other Monuments of National Importance in India
 List of State Protected Monuments in Karnataka

References 

Bidar
Monuments of National Importance
Monuments of National Importance